Sheldon McIntosh, known professionally as Tynomi Banks, is a Canadian drag queen. A staple of Toronto's queer nightlife scene since the 2010s, Tynomi Banks performed in drag for over a decade before competing on the first season of the reality competition television series Canada's Drag Race.

Early life
Born in Jamaica and raised in Pickering, Ontario, McIntosh later attended Durham College, studying public relations.

Career
A staple of Toronto's queer nightlife scene, Tynomi Banks has performed in the entertainment industry as a drag queen at bars, festivals, and events for over a decade. In 2018, during Pride Toronto, she was selected to participate in a marketing campaign for Crest and curated Spotify's playlist for the gay pride event.

Tynomi Banks served as a trophy bearer during the 7th Canadian Screen Awards in 2019. She appeared in Joseph Amenta's short film, Flood, which premiered at the 2019 Toronto International Film Festival. Tynomi Banks was a spokesperson for the Spanish jewelry company Carrera y Carrera, as of 2020.

In February 2021, Tynomi Banks released a Black Lives Matter-themed clothing line. In June 2021, she performed as a part of the Drive ’N Queens Summer Series.

Television

In 2019, Tynomi Banks appeared in the second season of the documentary series Canada's a Drag. The following year, she competed on the first season of the reality competition television series Canada's Drag Race, based on the American series RuPaul's Drag Race. One of the more popular contestants entering the competition, Tynomi Banks was eliminated during the fourth episode after placing in the bottom and lip syncing for her life three weeks in a row. Although no official Miss Congeniality was named in-show for the season, she won an informal poll of the queens in post-elimination interviews with the entertainment website PopBuzz.

In 2021, Tynomi Banks appeared in an advertisement for the online financial management platform Wealthsimple, which premiered during the Canadian broadcast of Super Bowl LV.

Personal life
McIntosh is Black Canadian and queer, and is based in Toronto. His drag artistry is inspired by Tyra Banks, Naomi Campbell, and Grace Jones, and he is known for impersonating Beyoncé and Whitney Houston. He has spoken to the media about his Jamaican heritage and how it influences his drag and performance style.

Filmography

Film

Television

Web series

Music videos

Discography

References

External links

 
 

Year of birth missing (living people)
Living people
21st-century Canadian LGBT people
Black Canadian LGBT people
Canada's Drag Race contestants
Canadian drag queens
Canadian people of Jamaican descent
People from Toronto
Queer people